Sucking the 70's is a two disc collection of 1970s songs covered by modern stoner rock bands. It was released by Small Stone Records in 2002. A second album, Sucking the 70's – Back in the Saddle Again, was released in 2006.
The album title is a reference to the Rolling Stones compilation Sucking in the Seventies.

Track listing

Disc 1 (78:05)
 "Never in My Life" – Five Horse Johnson 4:47 (originally performed by Mountain)
 "Black Betty" – Throttlerod 3:48 (first recorded commercially by Lead Belly, covered by Ram Jam)
 "On the Hunt" – Dixie Witch 6:05 (originally performed by Lynyrd Skynyrd)
 "Cross Eyed Mary" – Clutch 3:31 (originally performed by Jethro Tull)
 "T.V. Eye" – The Glasspack 4:47 (originally performed by The Stooges)
 "Free for All" – The Last Vegas 3:22 (originally performed by Ted Nugent)
 "Can't You See" – Halfway to Gone 4:53 (originally performed by The Marshall Tucker Band)
 "Working Man" – Suplecs 7:42 (originally performed by Rush)
 "Travelin' Band/Suzy Is a Headbanger" – Puny Human 4:19 (originally performed by Creedence Clearwater Revival/The Ramones)
 "We're an American Band" – Raging Slab 3:35 (originally performed by Grand Funk Railroad)
 "Brainstorm" – Los Natas 8:25 (originally performed by Hawkwind)
 "For Madmen Only" – The Heads 4:11 (originally performed by May Blitz)
 "Nasty Dogs & Funky Kings" – Lamont 2:33 (originally performed by ZZ Top)
 "Child of Babylon" – Backdraft 4:39 (originally performed by Whitesnake)
 "I Don't Have to Hide" – Black NASA 3:02 (originally performed by Bachman–Turner Overdrive)
 "Dog Eat Dog" – Warped 3:42  (originally performed by AC/DC)
 "Bron-Yr-Stomp" – Hangnail 4:35  (originally performed by Led Zeppelin)

Disc 2 (77:54)
 "Vehicle" – Roadsaw 2:53 (originally performed by The Ides of March)
 "20th Century Boy" – Novadriver 3:53 (originally performed by T. Rex)
 "Hymn 43" – Alabama Thunderpussy 3:24 (originally performed by Jethro Tull)
 "Communication Breakdown" – Disengage 2:39 (originally performed by Led Zeppelin)
 "Out on the Weekend" – Porn (The Men Of) 7:47 (originally performed by Neil Young)
 "Rumblin' Man" – Milligram 3:47 (originally performed by Cactus)
 "Working for MCA" – Tummler 6:34 (originally performed by Lynyrd Skynyrd)
 "Doctor Doctor" – Fireball Ministry 4:33 (originally performed by UFO)
 "Wicked World" – Spirit Caravan 5:33 (originally performed by Black Sabbath)
 "Freelance Fiend" – Lowrider 3:11 (originally performed by Leaf Hound)
 "Walk Away" – The Mushroom River Band 3:24 (originally performed by James Gang)
 "Woman Tamer" – Broadsword 5:26 (originally performed by Sir Lord Baltimore)
 "Don't Blow Your Mind" – Doubleneck 2:54 (originally performed by Alice Cooper)
 "Black to Comm" – Lord Sterling 4:33 (originally performed by MC5)
 "Till the Next Goodbye" – The Brought Low 5:32 (originally performed by The Rolling Stones)
 "Don't Call Us, We'll Call You" – Scott Reeder 3:29 (originally performed by Sugarloaf)
 "How Can You Win" – Tectonic Break 2:53 (originally performed by Parish Hall)
 "The Pusher" – Gideon Smith & the Dixie Damned 5:23 (originally performed by both Hoyt Axton and Steppenwolf)

2002 compilation albums